Thought reform can refer to:

Thought Reform:
 Mind control (or brainwashing, or coercive persuasion)
 Indoctrination
 Thought Reform and the Psychology of Totalism, a book by Robert Jay Lifton
Thought reform in the People's Republic of China